FI-TA is an Australian manufacturing company established in 2010 by Acline Sports, in the Sydney suburb of Marrickville, New South Wales. The company produces and supplies sportswear for cricket, rugby league, and field hockey teams, as well as referee uniforms for the National Rugby League (NRL), the top division of Australia.

Sponsorships

Rugby League

Former Sponsorships

Rugby league
  (2012-21)
  (2013–21)
  (2013–18)
  NRL Match Officials (2012–2020)
  Queensland Rugby League Match Officials (until 2020)
  Hull Kingston Rovers (2014–16)

Soccer 
  Gold Coast United- (2010-2012)

References

External links
 

Australian companies established in 2010
Clothing brands of Australia
Sportswear brands
Sporting goods brands
Sporting goods manufacturers of Australia
Companies based in New South Wales